"Change the World" is a song by Eric Clapton.

Change the World may also refer to:

 "Change the World", a song by Westlife from Westlife
 Change the World (Dawnstar EP), 2007
 Change the World (Martha Munizzi album), 2008
 Change the World (Ringo Starr EP), 2021
 Change the World: An Introduction, by Dokken
 "Change the World" (P.O.D. song), 2003
 "Change the World" (V6 song), 2000
 "Change the World", by Juliana Hatfield from the album There's Always Another Girl
 "Change the World", by The Offspring from the album Ixnay on the Hombre
 "Change the World", by Your Memorial from the album Redirect
 "Change the World", a non-album single by the Housemartins and Dino Lenny, 2003

See also 
 L: Change the World, a 2008 film in Death Note comic and animation franchise
 Change the World Without Taking Power, a 2002 book by activist John Holloway